Abul Wafa is an impact crater located near the lunar equator on the far side of the Moon, named after the Persian mathematician and astronomer Abu al-Wafa' Buzjani. To the east are the crater pair Ctesibius and Heron. In the northeast lies the larger crater King, and to the southwest is Vesalius.

The perimeter of this crater somewhat resembles a rounded diamond shape. The rim and inner walls are rounded from impact erosion, and have lost some definition. There are ledges around most of the inner wall that may have once been terraces or slumped piles of scree.

A small but notable crater lies on the inner surface of the north rim of Abul Wáfa, and there is a small crater formation attached to the exterior southwest wall. The outer rim is relatively free of impacts, and the interior floor is marked only by a few small craterlets.

Satellite craters
By convention these features are identified on lunar maps by placing the letter on the side of the crater midpoint that is closest to Abul Wáfa.

References

External links
 LTO-65D3 Abul Wafa — L&PI topographic map
Abul Wafa at The Moon Wiki

Impact craters on the Moon